Nagasako (written: 長嶝 or 長迫) is a Japanese surname. Notable people with the surname include:

, Japanese voice actor
Thumper Nagasako (born 1983), American vert skater
, Japanese cyclist

Japanese-language surnames